Fuladlui-ye Jonubi Rural District is in Hir District of Ardabil County, Ardabil province, Iran. At the census of 2006, its population was 3,148 in 629 households; there were 2,619 inhabitants in 662 households at the following census of 2011; and in the most recent census of 2016, it had decreased to 2,021 in 623 households. The largest of its 20 villages was Budalalu, with 352 people.

References 

Ardabil County

Rural Districts of Ardabil Province

Populated places in Ardabil Province

Populated places in Ardabil County